Ad Fontes Academy (AFA) is a private, classical Christian school in Centreville, Virginia. AFA teaches kindergarten through high-school (K–12) classes. Ad Fontes Academy provides a Classical Christian education. AFA is accredited by the Association of Classical and Christian Schools (ACCS). AFA is a nonprofit school operating under the nonprofit [501(c)(3)] Ad Fontes Educational Trust. Ad Fontes Academy meets on one campus locations at Centreville Presbyterian Church.

History

In November 1995, the National Christian Foundation for Education and The Arts Trust (NCF) was established with the goal of operating a non-denominational, academically rigorous high school in Northern Virginia.  Fundamental to NCF's goal was the belief that all labor in vain unless God directs our efforts – nisi Dominus frustra. In September 1996, NCF opened Ad Fontes Academy (AFA).  AFA recognizes that “each child is created in the image and likeness of God, the Creator, as a unique human being having a purpose for which he or she is created and is known by his deeds, by whether what he does is pure and right” and that “the knowledge and pursuit of truth, understanding and wisdom has the intended outcome of enabling the individual to fulfill the purpose for which he or she is created.”

When Ad Fontes Academy opened in September 1996, it started with 8 students in grades 9–10.  AFA graduated its first class of five seniors in June 1999.  In 2000, AFA added Grades 7 and 8 to the high school program. In 2003, Kindergarten was added and grades 1 to 6 the following year for a full K-12 program.

Teaching methodology
The teaching methodology is based on The Lost Tools of Learning The teachers further utilize the methods in John Milton Gregory's  book The Seven Laws of Teaching.

Upper school student life

Sports

Boys
 Baseball
 Basketball

Girls
 Volleyball

Boys and girls
 Cross Country
 Tennis

AFA is a member of the Northern Virginia Independent Athletic Conference (NVIAC)

Clubs
 Techne Society 
 Latin Club
 Theatre
 Artists' Society
 Yearbook Club
 Play Reading Club

Other activities
 Annual Fall Student Retreat
 Protocol (autumn and spring)
 House System
 Student-directed Shakespeare play

References

External links 
  

Christian schools in Virginia
High schools in Fairfax County, Virginia
Classical schools in Fairfax County, Virginia
Classical Christian schools
Private K-12 schools in Virginia
Educational institutions established in 1996
1996 establishments in Virginia